Many plants are poisonous to equines; the species vary depending on location, climate, and grazing conditions. In many cases, entire genera are poisonous to equines and include many species spread over several continents. Plants can cause reactions ranging from laminitis (found in horses bedded on shavings from black walnut trees), anemia, kidney disease and kidney failure (from eating the wilted leaves of red maples), to cyanide poisoning (from the ingestion of plant matter from members of the genus Prunus) and other symptoms. Members of genus Prunus have also been theorized to be at fault for mare reproductive loss syndrome. Some plants, including yews, are deadly and extremely fast-acting. Several plants, including nightshade, become more toxic as they wilt and die, posing a danger to horses eating dried hay or plant matter blown into their pastures.

The risk of animals becoming ill during the fall is increased, as many plants slow their growth in preparation for winter, and equines begin to browse on the remaining plants. Many toxic plants are unpalatable, so animals avoid them where possible. However, this is not always the case; locoweeds, for example, are addictive and once a horse has eaten them, it will continue to eat them whenever possible, and can never be exposed to them again. When a toxic plant is ingested, it can be difficult to diagnose, because exposure over time can cause symptoms to occur after the animal is no longer exposed to the plant. Toxins are often metabolized before the symptoms become obvious, making it hard or impossible to test for them. Hungry or thirsty horses are more likely to eat poisonous plants, as are those pastured on overgrazed lands. Animals with mineral deficiencies due to poor diets will sometimes seek out poisonous plants. Poisonous plants are more of a danger to livestock after wildfires, as they often regrow more quickly.

Poisonous plants

References

External links
 Contact information for Animal Poison Control Center in the United States

Horse health
Poisonous